Bruce Rushin is an art teacher and coin designer from Brundall in Norfolk, United Kingdom.

In 1997, Rushin entered (and won) a competition by submitting a design for the British Two Pound coin. Rushin had no previous experience in coin design. The design used concentric rings to illustrate technological progress, and is inscribed with Sir Isaac Newton's quote "Standing on the shoulders of giants". The Two Pound Coin is included in the collections of the Science Museum Group and the Royal Collection Trust.

In 2012 Rushin won a competition to design a coin for the 2012 Summer Olympics and the 2012 Summer Paralympics held in London, England.

Rushin taught at Flegg High School in Norfolk from 1990 to 2008.

References

Living people
British currency designers
English designers
People from Brundall
People educated at Wyggeston Grammar School for Boys
Year of birth missing (living people)